Gold Key: Alliance is a comic book limited series published by Dynamite Entertainment, which ran from April 6 to August 17, 2016.  The series featured five  Gold Key Comics characters: Magnus, Mighty Samson, Solar, Doctor Spektor and Turok.

Premise 
In a present day similar to the real world, there are alternate counterparts of four Gold Key original characters who co-exist but live different lives: Magnus is a secret agent monitoring the rise of military artificial intelligence and robotics around the globe, Turok is a reality television star and tribal park ranger in charge of some rare unique specimens, Samson is a homeless man ranting at unseen monsters on the streets of Manhattan, and Solar is a young female doctor on a mission of mercy in an impoverished part of Africa. But one day, each of them is hunted by an alternate counterpart of Doctor Spektor, who warns them about the upcoming destruction of the multiverse.

Trade paperback 
 Gold Key: Alliance (120 pages, paperback, December 27, 2016,  / )

References 

Gold Key Comics
2016 comics debuts
Crossover comics
Comics about parallel universes
Dynamite Entertainment titles
2016 comics endings